David Webb (July 2, 1925–1975) was an American jeweler. On July 28, 1948, he founded David Webb, the company, which opened at 2 West 46th Street. Among his clients were Elizabeth Taylor, Jacqueline Kennedy Onassis and Barbra Streisand. Helen Mirren, Jennifer Garner and Beyoncé have also worn his jewelry.

Born in Asheville, North Carolina on July 2, 1925. Webb was a self-taught designer whose work included dragon bracelets, Maltese cross brooches and animal motifs. In 1964, The Duke of Windsor purchased a bracelet for his wife. Diana Vreeland, a noted columnist and editor of Harper's Bazaar and Vogue, was often seen with a David Webb black-and-white enamel zebra bangle.

Webb died from pancreatic cancer in 1975. The business has been in continuous operation  and in 2010 was purchased by estate jewelers Mark Emanuel, Sima Ghadamian and Robert Sadian. The company's logo is a zebra.

A book about his work, David Webb: The Quintessential American Jeweler by Ruth Peltason, was published in 2013. In 2014, a retrospective exhibition was mounted at Norton Museum of Art in Palm Beach.

David Webb has flagship boutiques in both New York City on Madison Avenue and Rodeo Drive at The Beverly Wilshire Hotel.

References

External links
Official company website

American jewellers
Artists from Asheville, North Carolina
1925 births
1975 deaths
American company founders